The 1953–54 season was Manchester United's 52nd season in the Football League, and their ninth consecutive season in the top division of English football.

United finished the season in fourth place, recovering well after an eight-match winless start. Top scorer for the season was Tommy Taylor, who in his first full season at the club scored 22 goals in the league and a further goal in the FA Cup. 20-year-old striker Dennis Viollet established himself in the first team this season and scored 12 goals, and 17-year-old Duncan Edwards gradually displaced the veteran Henry Cockburn at left-half.

First Division

FA Cup

Squad statistics

References

Manchester United F.C. seasons
Manchester United